St John the Evangelist's Church is in the village of Osmotherley, Cumbria, England.  It is an active Anglican parish church in the deanery of Furness, the archdeaconry of Westmorland and Furness, and the diocese of Carlisle.  Its benefice is united with St Mary with Holy Trinity, Ulverston.  The church is recorded in the National Heritage List for England as a designated Grade II listed building.

History

The church was built in 1873–74 to a design by the Lancaster partnership of Paley and Austin.  It provided seating for about 150 people, and cost about £1,400.

Architecture

St John's is constructed in coursed slate rubble with sandstone dressings.  The roofs are slated, with tiles on the crest.  Its plan consists of a four-bay nave and a chancel in one range, a north porch, and a south vestry.  The chancel has an apsidal east end.  At the west end of the church is a bellcote with a spirelet.  All the windows are lancets, other than two square-headed windows in the vestry, and a rose window above two lancets at the west end.  The porch consists of a wooden frame on stone bases, and it is gabled.  The bellcote is wooden and hung with slates.  Its spirelet is broached at the base, and contains small lucarnes.

See also

List of ecclesiastical works by Paley and Austin

References

Churches completed in 1874
19th-century Church of England church buildings
Gothic Revival church buildings in England
Gothic Revival architecture in Cumbria
Church of England church buildings in Cumbria
Grade II listed churches in Cumbria
Diocese of Carlisle
Paley and Austin buildings
South Lakeland District